Alhadi (also Romanized as Alhādī) is a village in Qaleh Miran Rural District, in the Central District of Ramian County, Golestan Province, Iran. At the 2006 census, its population was 74, in 17 families.

References 

Populated places in Ramian County